Six Mile Run is an unincorporated community and census-designated place (CDP) located in Franklin Township, in Somerset County, New Jersey, United States. As of the 2010 United States Census, the CDP's population was 3,184.

Geography
According to the United States Census Bureau, Six Mile Run had a total area of 7.484 square miles (19.383 km2), including 7.476 square miles (19.363 km2) of land and 0.008 square miles (0.020 km2) of water (0.10%).

Demographics

Census 2010

Historic district on the National Register of Historic Places 

The National Register of Historic Places defines the Six Mile Run Historic District as roughly bounded by Grouser Road, Amwell Road, Bennetts Lane, New Jersey Route 27, a diagonal line from the bridge at Six Mile Run to South Middlebush Road at Claremont, Butler Road and the Millstone River. It includes a portion of the Delaware and Raritan Canal and the Six Mile Run Canal House that are separately listed on the National Register. It contains 149 contributing buildings, 5 contributing sites and 44 contributing structures.

Examples of Six Mile Run Historic District contributing buildings are the three Meadows Foundation maintained properties listed here:
Van Liew-Suydam House, 280 South Middlebush Road. It was built in  the 18th century by Peter Van Liew. Joseph Suydam later built the part of the house that is visible today. The newest and largest portion of the house was built in 1875. Although the most recent long term owner of the house was named French, the house has been named after its two initial owners.
Hageman Farm, 209 South Middlebush Road
Wyckoff-Garretson House, 215 South Middlebush Road

Historic village name

Six Mile Run is the historic name for an unincorporated community located within portions of North Brunswick Township and South Brunswick Township in Middlesex County and Franklin Township in Somerset County, in New Jersey.  Route 27 (historically known as Old Road/King's Highway and once part of the Lincoln Highway system) bisects the village and serves as the dividing line between the two counties.  The name of the settlement was formally changed from Six Mile Run to Franklin Park on June 25, 1872.

Six Mile Run Reformed Church

In 1710, a congregation of the Dutch Reformed Church (now the Reformed Church in America) formed the Six Mile Run Reformed Church. The first building was replaced by a new building in 1766 and was later replaced in 1817 by a third structure on the same site. The current building replaced the 1817 church that was destroyed by fire in 1879. The Frelinghuysen Memorial Chapel was added in 1907 and the Fellowship Hall was dedicated in 1958.

Six Mile Run Reservoir

The proposed Six Mile Run Reservoir Site is adjacent to the Delaware and Raritan Canal and included a large portion of the Six Mile Run Watershed in central Franklin Township. In 1970, the land for the reservoir was acquired by the State through the New Jersey Department of Environmental Protection, Division of Water Resources as a future reservoir and recreation area and included many of the properties later listed as contributing to the Six Mile National Register Historic District. The reservoir was never built, and in 1993 administration of the area was transferred to the Division of Parks and Forestry.

Six Mile Run Reservoir section of the Delaware and Raritan Canal State Park
Today the Six Mile Run Reservoir site is maintained as a State Park and includes several trails that are used primarily by mountain bikers, hikers, and horseback riders. It has  of twisting single track maintained by JORBA.  Access to the park can be found at the large parking lot on Canal Road near Six Mile Run Road, from the parking lot of the private soccer club on Route 27, and from several smaller parking areas on roads that traverse the park.

Because part of the land at the site was taken out of cultivation 39 years ago, the process of "old field succession" has now yielded up trees and foliage that are unique among state park lands. In the section between Canal Road and South Middlebush Road, there are postings describing the foliage and the natural process. The "Red Dot" hiking trail, which runs between Canal Road and South Middlebush Road, has now been extended from South Middlebush Road up to NJ Route 27. There is a new White Trail, not fully blazed but very usable, running from a left fork off Red Dot near South Middlebush Road, to a parking lot off Jacques Lane.

See also
Three Mile Run, New Jersey, now incorporated into New Brunswick, New Jersey
Ten Mile Run, New Jersey

References

Sources
 Brahms, William B., Franklin Township, Somerset County, NJ: A History, Franklin Township Public Library, 1998;

External links
Six Mile Run Reformed Church
NJ Churchscape: Six Mile Run Reformed Church

Franklin Township, Somerset County, New Jersey
Census-designated places in Somerset County, New Jersey
Historic districts on the National Register of Historic Places in New Jersey
National Register of Historic Places in Somerset County, New Jersey